William Phillipps may refer to:
 William Herbert Phillipps, South Australian businessman and philanthropist
 William J. Phillipps, New Zealand ichthyologist

See also
 William Philipps (disambiguation)
 William Phillips (disambiguation)